The Staffordshire Owen Cup is an annual rugby union knock-out club competition organised by the Staffordshire Rugby Union.  It was first introduced during the 1980–81 season, with the inaugural winners being Willenhall. It is the third most important rugby union cup competition in Staffordshire, behind the Staffordshire Senior Cup and Staffordshire Intermediate Cup.

The Owen Cup is open to club sides based in Staffordshire and parts of the West Midlands typically playing in tier 8 (Midlands 3 West (North)), tier 9 (Midlands 4 West (North)) and tier 10 (Midlands 5 West (North)) of the English rugby union system.  The current format is a knock-out competition with a preliminary round, first round, semi-finals and a final played at a neutral ground in April–May.  Teams that are knocked out of the early rounds of the cup take part in the Owen Rubery Cup which has a semi-final and final, held on the same date and same venue as the Owen Cup final. At present Owen Cup finals are held on the same date and at the same venue as the Staffordshire Intermediate Cup finals.

Staffordshire Owen Cup winners

Staffordshire Rubery Owen Cup winners

Number of wins

Cup
Rugeley (6)
Uttoxeter (6)
Burntwood (5)
Cannock (4)
Barton-under-Needwood (3)
Bloxwich (2)
Eccleshall (2)
St Leonards (2)
Trentham (2)
Willenhall (2)
Linley & Kidsgrove (1)
Staffordshire Fire Brigade (1)
Staffordshire Police (1)
Wednesbury (1)

Rubery Cup
Essington (2)
Rugeley (2)
Linley & Kidsgrove (1)
St Leonards (1)
Whittingham (1)

Notes

See also
 Staffordshire RU
 Staffordshire Senior Cup
 Staffordshire Intermediate Cup
 English rugby union system
 Rugby union in England

References

External links
 Staffordshire RU

Recurring sporting events established in 1980
1980 establishments in England
Rugby union cup competitions in England
Rugby union in Staffordshire
Sport in Staffordshire